State Route 88 (SR 88) is a highway generally running in an east–west direction in the northeastern portion of the U.S. state of Ohio. Its southern terminus is in Portage County at SR 59 at the intersection of Freedom Street with Main Street in Ravenna. SR 88 is labeled north-south southwest of U.S. Route 422 (US 422) and SR 168/SR 528, and labeled east-west east of there. SR follows a northerly direction for a little more than  along Freedom Street, to the SR 14 and SR 44 concurrency bypass. From here, the route heads in a northeasterly direction. SR 88 then continues northeast, crossing over Interstate 80 and the Ohio Turnpike, before turning due north as it enters Garrettsville. Here, as South Street, the route intersects SR 82 (State Street and Main Street), then becomes North Street before exiting the corporation limits.

The route continues northward, entering Geauga County, becoming McCall Road here, and intersects US 422 in Parkman; this is also the southern termini of State Routes 168 and 528, which overlap SR 88 (first as Main Street, and then Madison Road).

The route passes through West Farmington as Main Street, then continues as Greenville Road, intersecting SR 534, SR 45 at Bristolville, and SR 46. SR 88 crosses over SR 11 before joining with SR 5 (Warren-Meadville Road), which enters from the southwest about  before they intersect SR 193 (Youngstown-Kingsville Road).  About  later, SR 88 leaves the concurrency and continues east as Greenville Road to its last intersection at SR 7 in Vernon before its eastern terminus at the Pennsylvania state line, where Pennsylvania Route 358 (Vernon Road) continues east.

History
SR 88 was commissioned in 1923, on its current alignment between Garrettsville and Parkman. In 1927 the route was extended east to the Pennsylvania state line. The highway between Ravenna and SR 7 was paved in 1928. The section of road between SR 7 and the Pennsylvania state line was paved in 1933.

Major intersections

References

External links

088
Ohio State Route 088
Ohio State Route 088
Ohio State Route 088